WKMJ can refer to:

 WKMJ-FM, a radio station (93.5 FM) licensed to Hancock, Michigan, United States
 WKMJ-TV, a television station (channel 34, virtual 68) licensed to Louisville, Kentucky, United States, part of Kentucky Educational Television